Vuknić is a village in the municipality of Istočni Stari Grad, Bosnia and Herzegovina.

References

Populated places in Istočni Stari Grad
Villages in Republika Srpska